Docynia (栘𣐿属, yí yī shǔ) is a genus of flowering trees, evergreen or semi-evergreen, in the family Rosaceae. The fruit is a pome. The tree is endemic to Southeast Asia, including Myanmar where it grows wild and is sometimes cultivated..

Species
 Docynia delavayi (Franchet) C.K.Schneider
 Docynia indica (Wallich) Decaisne

Formerly placed here
Malus doumeri resembles Docynia, but the internal structure of the fruit matches Malus.

References

 Decaisne, Nouv. Arch. Mus. Hist. Nat. 10: 125, 131. 1874.

External links

Maleae
Rosaceae genera
Taxa named by Joseph Decaisne